John Geraghty is an American former professional tennis player.

Geraghty, who grew up in Hialeah, Florida, had a small build and was known more for finesse than power hitting.

Following two years with Appalachian State, Geraghty played collegiate tennis for the University of Miami and was an NCAA doubles quarter-finalist with John Eagleton in 1977, earning All-American honors. He was team captain in 1978.

Geraghty's career on tour included appearance at the Wimbledon Championships and US Open.

References

External links
 
 

Year of birth missing (living people)
Living people
American male tennis players
Miami Hurricanes men's tennis players
Appalachian State Mountaineers athletes
Tennis people from Florida
People from Hialeah, Florida
Sportspeople from Miami-Dade County, Florida